Venerable Joseph Sarvananthan was an Anglican priest, in the Diocese of Colombo of the Church of Ceylon in Sri Lanka. He was made a deacon in 1965 and ordained as a priest in 1966.

Life
Known as Fr Sarva or Sarvananthan 'Pothagar', he served in Bandarawela, Chilaw, Jaffna and Colombo. He has been a chaplain to St. John's College, Jaffna and C.M.S. Ladies' College, Colombo Colombo and dean of post-ordination training. He was the chairman of the board of governors for the CMS schools. He was also the archdeacon of Jaffna from 1995 to 2001. Finally he served as priest in charge of Christ Church, Galle Face, before his untimely death after a brief illness.

Father Sarvananthan faithfully served God and the Body of Christ for 44 years.

He had his primary and secondary education at Jaffna College, Vaddukottai, Jaffna, Sri Lanka. Degree at Divinity School Colombo, which is affiliated to Serampore College, India. Furthermore, he went to Château De Bossey in Geneva to do his master's degree in theology in 1986.

As a member of the Faith and Order Commission of the World Council of Churches , Ven. J Sarvananthan attended the Christian Conference of Asia, which convened in Malaysia in July and August 2004.

Fr Sarva along with his wife Iris was present at the ordination of his eldest son Sudharshan Sarvananthan at Carlisle Cathedral in June 2008. His son, who finally decided to take holy orders following in his father's footsteps, served his title post in the Heart of Eden Team Ministry in rural Cumbria, UK.

See also
Church of Ceylon

References

External links
 The Church of Ceylon (Anglican Communion)
 Anglican Church of Ceylon News

See also
 His inner life and spirituality made him what he was – The Sunday Times 27 February 2011
 Christian Perspectives – Daily News 3 March 2011
 He touched and enriched our lives – The Sunday Times 6 March 2011
 A dedicated man of God – Daily Mirror 15 March 2011

Further reading
The Report of the Standing Committee 2010/2011 of the Diocese of Colombo - 126th Annual Session of the Diocesan Council, Page 36
The Annual Magazine of Ladies College, Colombo, Sri Lanka - Page 98

Anglican chaplains
Sri Lankan Anglican priests
Sri Lankan chaplains
Sri Lankan educational theorists
Sri Lankan Tamil priests
Alumni of Jaffna College
Living people
Year of birth missing (living people)